Jordan "Jordi" Swibel (born 13 April 1999) is an Australian professional footballer who plays as a forward for  Marconi Stallions.

Club career

Youth Career
Swibel started as a youth for Hakoah where he played in the youth ranks for the club since 2011. During the 2016 season, he was the U-18s top goalscorer, helping his side become league winners. As a result of his impressive performance, he was given the opportunity to play in his debut senior match, coming off the bench in a cup game against Picton Rangers.

Swibel was given a trial by Maccabi Tel Aviv F.C. after being scouted in a tournament where he featured for Australia in Israel.

Sydney FC
Swibel was part of the 2019-20 Y-League championship winning Sydney FC Youth team. He played the full game and scored the opening goal as the Sky Blues beat Melbourne Victory Youth 5–1 in the 2020 Y-League Grand Final on 31 January 2020.

On 4 January 2020, Swibel made his professional debut in a Round 13 clash against Adelaide United, replacing Kosta Barbarouses in the 87th minute as they ran out 2–1 winners.
He also came off the bench against Newcastle Jets in Round 14 replacing Adam Le Fondre in a 2–1 win and against Western Sydney Wanderers in Round 18 replacing Alexander Baumjohann in a 1–0 loss.

Swibel was also selected in the clubs Asian Champions League squads for the 2019 and 2020 campaigns. While not featuring in 2019 due to injury he was in the match day squad for the away fixture in Japan against Yokohama F.Marinos which Sydney FC lost 4–0 and the home match against South Korea's Jeonbuk Motors FC which ended in a 2–2 draw.

Swibel traveled to Doha Qatar for the rebooted Asian Champions League hub for the remaining four fixtures being in the match day squad for all games. He made his Asian Champions League debut against Jeonbuk Hyundai Motors FC coming on for Paulo Retre in the 83rd minute of a 1–0 loss. He also played against Yokohama F. Marinos when he came on as a substitute for Trent Buhagiar in the 73rd minute of a 1–1 draw.

In January 2021, Swibel signed a one-year scholarship deal, but was later released by Sydney FC in July.

Western Sydney Wanderers
In October 2021, Swibel signed a one-year scholarship contract with A-League Men club Western Sydney Wanderers after scoring a goal for them while on trial in a pre-season friendly against Central Coast Mariners. In July 2022, the club confirmed the departure of four players, including Swibel.

Hapoel Nof HaGalil
In July 2022, Swibel arrived in Israel to trial with Israeli Premier League club F.C. Ashdod, following a recommendation by Tomer Hemed who played with him at Western Sydney Wanderers. He is not considered a foreigner in the Israeli leagues, due to his Jewish heritage. Following the training camp, in August 2022, Swibel didn't join F.C. Ashdod, signing instead a one-year contract with Hapoel Nof HaGalil who had been relegated to the 2022–23 Liga Leumit, Israel's second tier. In his second match he scored his first goal, giving his club the win in a 2–1 victory over Hapoel Rishon LeZion.

Marconi Stallions
On December 12 2022, Swibel returned to Australia, to join the Marconi Stallions in the second division. He scored his first goal for the club in his second match against Sydney FC, contributing to the Stallions' 5-0 win, during which he netted two goals.

Personal Life
Swibel is a fan of Leeds United and holds a particular liking for player, Ross Barkley.

Honours

Club

Sydney FC
 Y-League: 2019–20 Conference B Premiers
Y-League: 2019–20 Champions
 A-League:2019–20 Premiers
 A-League:2019–20 Champions

References

External links

1999 births
Living people
Australian Jews
Jewish Australian sportspeople
Jewish footballers
Australian soccer players
Association football forwards
Sydney FC players
Western Sydney Wanderers FC players
Hapoel Nof HaGalil F.C. players
National Premier Leagues players
Liga Leumit players